The Avalon 9 trimaran is a trailerable fast cruising and racing sailboat designed by Ray Kendrick. It is a development of the earlier Avalon 8.2 and is similar to the Scarab 8 with more space. It is sold in plan form.

See also
 List of multihulls

References

Trimarans